They-sous-Vaudemont (literally They under Vaudemont) is a commune in the Meurthe-et-Moselle department in north-eastern France.

Population

See also
Communes of the Meurthe-et-Moselle department

References

Theysousvaudemont